Esben Hansen (born 10 August 1981) is a Danish former professional footballer who played as a midfielder. He made his international debut for the Denmark national team in a game against Liechtenstein on 13 September 2007, when he was named in the starting 11.

References

External links
 Lyngby profile 
 
 Official Danish Superliga stats 
 

1981 births
Living people
People from Guldborgsund Municipality
Danish men's footballers
Association football midfielders
Denmark international footballers
Denmark under-21 international footballers
Nykøbing FC players
Odense Boldklub players
Randers FC players
1. FC Kaiserslautern players
Danish Superliga players
2. Bundesliga players
Danish expatriate men's footballers
Danish expatriate sportspeople in Germany
Expatriate footballers in Germany
Sportspeople from Region Zealand